Matrimelee is an arcade fighting game published by Playmore. It's the fifth installment in the Power Instinct series, and the second fighting game developed by Noise Factory after Rage of the Dragons. The game was first released on Neo Geo arcade system on March 20, 2003, and it was one of the last games to be released on the system. The title is a portmanteau of "matrimony" and "melee".

Matrimelee ignores gameplay elements introduced in its predecessor, Groove on Fight, and goes back to 1-on-1 match structure. A few of the game elements from Rage of the Dragons were integrated to this game, such as the special meter that slowly fills up when an attack connects with an opponent and the four guest stars.

In 2006, the game was released on PlayStation 2 exclusively in Japan, under the new title . This port treats itself a sequel, taking place after the events from Matrimelee, with more changes in gameplay and the addition of new characters while removing the Rage of the Dragons cast.

Gameplay 

Matrimelee discards all the characters introduced in Groove of Fight and brings back the roster from Power Instinct 2 (except Angela, Oshima, Sahad and Kinta, the latter of whom was replaced by his alter-ego of kinta, Poochi), plus 4 totally new characters and one new boss (Princess Sissy). It features four unlockable guest characters from Rage of the Dragons: Jimmy, Elias, Lynn, and Mr. Jones. In the game's story, the King of Certain Country wants to find a worthy successor for the throne and the ideal husband for his little daughter (or a beautiful and strong woman for his older son) - thus holding a fighting tournament where the prize is the hand of the princess and the throne succession.

The game inherits the Stress meter system from  Power Instinct 2, but with further changes. The Stress meter now could be filled up to three levels. Super moves included are a Stress Shot (one bar), an Ippatsu Ougi (two bars) and a powerful, hidden super attack called a Kinjite (three bars). However, only a few of the characters have Kinjite moves. Finally, transformations are no longer possible.

Release 
Matrimelee was ported to PlayStation 2 in May 25, 2006, under the title . It was released exclusively in Japan. It features enhanced graphics and sound, the return of 2 of the older characters, Angela Belti, and Kinta Kokuin, a new boss (Bobby Strong, a comedic re-interpretation of Nigerian-Japanese personality Bobby Ologun, who provided his voice for the game), and the return of the transformation feature. Gameplay was also improved in some areas, and super attacks were made easier to execute. The game has the same backgrounds and all the characters from Matrimelee (except the four secret characters from Rage of the Dragons), while the game's story takes place after the events from the previous game, making it a sort of sequel or update. The game tells the story of the king from the previous game, who holds a "Bonnou Kaihou" ("Liberation of Lusts") tournament to cheer up his daughter Princess Sissy. This time the prize is anything that the winner could wish for (except the throne succession).

This version also features an online mode and a 'Lust Cards System' that consists of buying cards with special effects. Some allow the player to change certain characteristics of the characters, others are used to view special music video clips, and others to call strange characters to help the player in battle.

Reception

Notes

References

See also
 Rage of the Dragons

External links
  
 Game Excite's website for Shin Gōketsuji Ichizoku: Bonnō Kaihō 
 

2003 video games
Atlus games
Arcade video games
Fighting games
Neo Geo games
SNK Playmore games
PlayStation 2 games
Multiplayer and single-player video games
Video games developed in Japan